Lal qila (Pashto/Urdu: لعل قلعه) is a town and a union council of Lower Dir District in Khyber Pakhtunkhwa, Pakistan. it lies in Dir, K.P.K., Pakistan and its geographical coordinates are 34°57′10″N 71°48′41E".

Lower Dir District has 37 union councils with a population of 797,852, according to the 1998 census report. The  population growth rate of the Lower Dir District was 3.42% per annum between the 1981 and 1998 censuses.

Union councils

1. Bishgram

2. Lal Qilla

3. Gall Maidan

4. Kotkai

5. Zaimdara

See also

 Lower Dir District

Lower Dir District
Union Councils of Lower Dir District
Union councils of Khyber Pakhtunkhwa